Hardeep Singh (born 13 December 1981) is an Indian first-class cricketer who plays for Jammu and Kashmir.

References

External links
 

1981 births
Living people
Indian cricketers
Jammu and Kashmir cricketers
Cricketers from Jammu and Kashmir